Hillcrest High School may refer to:

Canada 
 Hillcrest High School (Ottawa), in Ottawa, Ontario
 Hillcrest High School (Thunder Bay), in the Port Arthur area of Thunder Bay, Ontario

Malaysia
 SMK Hillcrest

New Zealand 
 Hillcrest High School (New Zealand), in Hamilton, New Zealand

South Africa 
 Hillcrest High School (South Africa), in South Africa

United States 
 Hillcrest High School (Evergreen, Alabama), in Evergreen, Alabama
 Hillcrest High School (Tuscaloosa, Alabama), in Tuscaloosa, Alabama
 Hillcrest High School (Arkansas), in Strawberry, Arkansas
 Hillcrest High School (Inglewood, California), in Inglewood, California (Los Angeles metropolitan area)
 Hillcrest High School (Riverside, California), in Riverside, California (Inland Empire)
 Hillcrest High School (Ammon, Idaho), in Ammon, Idaho
 Hillcrest High School (Country Club Hills, Illinois), in Country Club Hills, Illinois (Chicago metropolitan area)
 Hillcrest High School (Kansas), in Cuba, Kansas
 Hillcrest High School (Springfield, Missouri), in Springfield, Missouri
 Hillcrest High School (Queens), in New York City
 Hillcrest High School (Dalzell, South Carolina), in Dalzell, South Carolina
 Hillcrest High School (Simpsonville, South Carolina), in Simpsonville, South Carolina
 Hillcrest High School (Tennessee), in Memphis, Tennessee
 Hillcrest High School (Dallas), in Dallas, Texas
 Hillcrest High School (Midvale, Utah), in Midvale, Utah

Zimbabwe 
 Hillcrest College (Mutare), in Zimbabwe

See also 
 Hillcrest School (disambiguation)